Chonlatit Jantakam (born June 2, 1985), simply known as Chon, is a Thai professional footballer who plays as a centre back or defensive midfielder for Thai League 3 club Pattaya Dolphins United.

Club career

He played for Chonburi FC in the 2008 AFC Champions League group stages.

International career

On the back of performing extremely well in the Thailand Premier League, Cholratit was called up to the full national side in coach Peter Reid's first squad announcement. He was called up with 35 other players to the 2008 T&T Cup hosted by Vietnam. He made his debut against North Korea on October 28, 2008 in the T&T Cup 2008. Cholratit was a member of the victorious T&T Cup 2008 winning squad. He was a member of the 2012 AFF Suzuki Cup. In 2013, he was called up to the national team by Surachai Jaturapattarapong to the 2015 AFC Asian Cup qualification. In October, 2013 he played a friendly match against Bahrain. In October 15, 2013 he played against Iran in the 2015 AFC Asian Cup qualification.

Honours

Club
Chonburi
 Thai Premier League: 2007
 Thai FA Cup: 2010
 Kor Royal Cup: 2008, 2009, 2010, 2011

International
Thailand U-23
 Sea Games: 2007

Thailand
 T&T Cup: 2008

References

External links
 Profile at Goal
https://us.soccerway.com/players/chonlatit-jantakam/26409/

1985 births
Living people
Chonlatit Jantakam
Chonlatit Jantakam
Association football central defenders
Chonlatit Jantakam
Chonlatit Jantakam
Chonlatit Jantakam
Southeast Asian Games medalists in football
Chonlatit Jantakam
Competitors at the 2007 Southeast Asian Games